The 2021 Chicago Women's Open was a tennis tournament held in Chicago, Illinois for female professional tennis players, and part of the 2021 WTA Tour. It was played on outdoor hard courts in the week prior to the 2021 U.S. Open. This marked the first time since 1997 that a WTA tournament was held in Chicago.

Champions

Singles

  Elina Svitolina def.  Alizé Cornet, 7–5, 6–4.

This was Svitolina's sixteenth WTA Tour singles title, and first of the year.

Doubles

  Nadiia Kichenok /  Raluca Olaru def.  Lyudmyla Kichenok /  Makoto Ninomiya, 7–6(8–6), 5–7, [10–8].

Singles main draw entrants

Seeds

 Rankings are as of August 16, 2021.

Other entrants
The following players received wildcards into the main draw:
  Françoise Abanda
  Katherine Sebov
  Elina Svitolina
  Venus Williams

The following players received entry from the qualifying draw:
  Ana Bogdan 
  Zarina Diyas 
  Quinn Gleason
  Aldila Sutjiadi 

The following player received entry as a lucky loser:
  Clara Burel

Withdrawals
Before the tournament
  Camila Giorgi → replaced by  Clara Burel
  Andrea Petkovic → replaced by  Varvara Gracheva
  Elena Rybakina → replaced by  Misaki Doi
  Ajla Tomljanović → replaced by  Fiona Ferro

Doubles main draw entrants

Seeds

Rankings are as of August 16, 2021.

Withdrawals
Before the tournament
  Anastasia Potapova /  Heather Watson → replaced by  Bárbara Gatica /  Rebeca Pereira

References

External links
 Official website

Chicago Women's Open
Chicago Women's Open
2021 in Illinois
Chicago Women's Open
Chicago Women's Open